Camolin is a village in County Wexford in Ireland, situated in the valley of the River Bann on the R772 regional road  northeast of Ferns. As of the 2016 census, the village had a population of 415 people.

Transport
Camolin railway station opened on 1 November 1867, but finally closed on 30 March 1964.

Sport
The community field, situated on the Main Street, is used by two sporting clubs; Camolin Celtic AFC and St. Patrick's GAA Club.

Camolin Celtic cater for both men's and ladies' teams. They field men's and boys' teams from Under-8 level to senior, and ladies' teams at Under-10, Under-14 and senior levels.

St. Patrick's GAA club field both hurling and Gaelic football teams from Under-8 to Senior level.

People
Conleth O'Connor (1947–1993), poet

See also
 List of towns and villages in Ireland

References

Towns and villages in County Wexford